L'Arlésienne, L'Arlésienne : Madame Ginoux, or Portrait of Madame Ginoux is the title given to a group of six similar paintings by Vincent van Gogh, painted in Arles, November 1888 (or later), and in Saint-Rémy, February 1890. L'Arlésienne means literally "the woman from Arles".

The subject, Marie Jullian (or Julien), was born in Arles June 8, 1848 and died there August 2, 1911. She married Joseph-Michel Ginoux in 1866 and together they ran the Café de la Gare, 30 Place Lamartine, where van Gogh lodged from May to mid-September 1888. He had the Yellow House in Arles furnished to settle there.

Evidently until this time, van Gogh's relations to M. and Mme. Ginoux had remained more or less commercial (the café is the subject of The Night Café), but Gauguin's arrival in Arles altered the situation. His courtship charmed the lady, then about 40 years of age, and in the first few days of November 1888 Madame Ginoux agreed to have a portrait session for Gauguin, and his friend van Gogh. Within an hour, Gauguin produced a charcoal drawing while Vincent produced a full-scale painting, "knocked off in one hour".

November 1888 version and its repetition
Van Gogh's first version, now in the Musée d'Orsay, Paris, is painted on burlap. A complete piece of this fabric was acquired by Gauguin just after his arrival in Arles, and used by both artists in November and December 1888.

For the second version, now in the Metropolitan Museum of Art in New York City, van Gogh again painted on the commercially pre-primed canvas he had previously used, and he replaced the gloves and umbrella with three books.

February 1890 versions
While in the asylum at Saint-Rémy, van Gogh painted another five portraits of Madame Ginoux, based on Gauguin's charcoal drawing of November 1888. Of these, one was intended for Gauguin, one for his brother Theo, one for himself and one for Madame Ginoux. The provenance of the version in the Kröller-Müller Museum is not known in detail, but the painting is known to have been previously owned by Albert Aurier, an early champion of Vincent's paintings. The version intended for Madame Ginoux was lost and has not been recovered. This is the version Vincent was delivering to Madame Ginoux in Arles when he suffered his relapse on February 22, 1890. In an unfinished letter to Gauguin that was never sent, Vincent remarked that working on her portrait cost him another month of illness. Gauguin's version was the one with a pink background, currently in the São Paulo Museum of Art. Gauguin was enthusiastic about the portrait, writing:

I've seen the canvas of Madame Ginoux. Very fine and very curious, I like it better than my drawing. Despite your ailing state you have never worked with so much balance while conserving the sensation and the interior warmth needed for a work of art, precisely in an era when art is a business regulated in advance by cold calculations.
 
In a letter to his sister Wil, dated 5 June 1890, Vincent set out his philosophy for doing portraits: "I should like to do portraits which will appear as revelations to people in a hundred years' time. In other words I am not trying to achieve this by photographic likeness but by rendering our impassioned expressions, by using our modern knowledge and appreciation of colour as a means of rendering and exalting character ... The portrait of the Arlésienne has a colourless and matt flesh tone, the eyes are calm and very simple, the clothing is black, the background pink, and she is leaning on a green table with green books. But in the copy that Theo has, the clothing is pink, the background yellowy-white, and the front of the open bodice is muslin in a white that merges into green. Among all these light colours, only the hair, the eyelashes and the eyes form black patches."

On 2 May 2006, the painting with the floral background sold at auction at Christie's, New York, for more than $40million (USD). This was the version that Vincent gave to Theo.

Gauguin's versions
Gauguin produced a charcoal sketch at the original sitting of Madame Ginoux in November 1888, and later produced a canvas, Café de Nuit, Arles, which features Mme. Ginoux in her and her husband's café.

The Arena
Les Arènes, also painted during Gauguin's stay in Arles, is said to depict various real life subjects of Van Gogh's, including members of the Roulin Family and Madame Ginoux, whose profile can be seen in the woman in Arlésienne costume.

References in culture 
In the book Lolita, by Vladimir Nabokov, the narrator calls L'Arlésienne "that banal darling of the arty middle class".

Resources

Pedigrees

Footnotes

External links

 BBC news story of May 2006 auction
Van Gogh, paintings and drawings: a special loan exhibition, a fully digitized exhibition catalog from The Metropolitan Museum of Art Libraries, which contains material on this painting (see index)

Paintings of Arles by Vincent van Gogh
1888 paintings
1890 paintings
Paintings in the collection of the Musée d'Orsay
Paintings in the collection of the Museum of Modern Art (New York City)
Paintings in the collection of the Galleria Nazionale d'Arte Moderna
Portraits of women
Books in art